Andrew Kahn (born July 23, 1952), frequently credited as Andy Kahn, is a music composer, arranger and producer who was most active in the dance and disco scene in the late 1970s. In 1978, he wrote and produced Karen Young's song, "Hot Shot", for West End Records. The song entered into many of Billboard's sixteen regional Disco Action charts in July, August and September of that year, reaching the number one spot in  Billboard's national Disco Action Top 40 chart on August 5, 1978, for two weeks. Prior recording achievement: Arranger for 1973 Grammy Award Gospel release on ABC Records of "Loves Me Like A Rock" by The Dixie Hummingbirds. In 2009, Kahn returned to performing solo onstage, presenting a repertoire by American composers from the first half of the 20th century. He co-produced and performed on Hollywood/TV veteran vocalist Peggy King's CD "Songs a la King." In 2016, Andy Kahn became a Steinway Spirio Artist. He is a frequent adjunct presenter at preparatory and charter schools, colleges and universities, lecturing on The Great American Songbook, and on Jazz Harmony & Improvisation. Andy Kahn is currently a voting member for The Recording Academy Grammy Awards. First book published Jan 2019 - "The HOT SHOT Heard 'Round The World" - A Musical Memoir.

References

Living people
1952 births
Musicians from Philadelphia
Jazz music arrangers
American jazz composers
American jazz pianists
American male pianists
American music educators
20th-century American pianists
Jazz musicians from Pennsylvania
Educators from Pennsylvania
21st-century American pianists
American male jazz composers
American memoirists
20th-century American male musicians
21st-century American male musicians